The Mont Buet (3,096 m) is a mountain of the Chablais Alps in Haute-Savoie, France. Mont Buet has played an important role in the history of science at the end of the eighteenth century when a series of Genevan scientists such as Jean-André Deluc, Horace Bénédict de Saussure or Marc-Auguste Pictet climbed to the summit to carry out scientific observations. Before the first successful ascents on the Mont Blanc in 1786, Mont Buet was "the highest among those accessible in this area" of the Alps. Mont Buet remains a popular destination especially because of the exceptional view on Mont Blanc, and the panoramic view from the summit.

History

The first known attempt at ascending on Mont Buet was that of the Jean-André Deluc and his brother in 1765. After a second failed attempt, Deluc and his brother managed to reach the summit on 25 September 1770. Here, they carried out a series of scientific measurements which was the initial purpose of their expedition.

Using a portable barometer designed by himself, Deluc measured the air pressure on the summit. By comparing this result to a parallel measurement taken by his father in Geneva, and after correcting for temperature, Deluc inferred that Mont Buet was at an altitude of 2674 m above Lake Geneva, and 3040 m above sea level (2% less than the modern value). Deluc took advantage of the position and visibility of Mont Blanc from the summit of Mont Buet to determine its relative height, from which he derived that Mont Blanc was 4660 m above sea level. This was 400 m higher than the earlier trigonometric measurement of Mont Blanc by Nicolas Fatio de Duillier, and made the Mont Blanc the highest peak in Europe. Deluc also boiled water to determine how its boiling temperature varied with altitude.

Deluc reached the summit of Mont Buet from the side of Sixt by climbing directly through the cirque of Fonts. Because this route was considered to be too demanding, in 1775 the Genevan artist and travel writer Marc-Théodore Bourrit sought a different path from the southern side of Chamonix and Vallorcine. This path follows along the valley of the Bérard to the refuge of the Pierre à Bérard.

In 1776, the Genevan geologist Horace Bénédict de Saussure followed the path discovered by Bourrit to reach the summit of Mont Buet. Impressed with the view, Saussure instructed Bourrit with drawing a panorama (vue circulaire) from the summit of Mont Buet. This is generally considered to be the first 360-degree panorama, a genre of representation which became popular in the late eighteenth century. 
Saussure embarked on a second expedition in 1778 accompanied by Marc-Auguste Pictet and Jean Trembley who carried out measurements with a barometer and magnetometer. Using a sextant Pictet also measured the altitude of Mont Blanc, and found it to be 4727 m.

Climbing Routes

There are two principle routes to the summit of Mont Buet:

Views

References

External links
Multimedia archive of historical and contemporary expeditions on Mont Buet
Mont Buet on Summitpost.org

Alpine three-thousanders
Mountains of Haute-Savoie
Mountains of the Alps